Yohan Durand (born May 14, 1985 in Bergerac, Dordogne) is a French middle and long distance runner.

In 2018, he competed in the men's marathon at the 2018 European Athletics Championships held in Berlin, Germany. He finished in 31st place.

Achievements

References

1985 births
Living people
People from Bergerac, Dordogne
French male long-distance runners
French male middle-distance runners
Sportspeople from Dordogne
French male marathon runners
21st-century French people